Store Mosse ("Big Marsh") is a national park in  Småland in southern Sweden, located in the municipalities of Vaggeryd, Gnosjö and Värnamo.

It has the largest boggy grounds south of Lapland and is an important area for birds and provides unique habitats for other animals and plants.

Access to the park is free; guided tours are available all summer. There are also guided snowshoe tours on the bog in the summer.

Store Mosse National Park lies in the South Swedish highlands and the South Småland peneplain.

The area is not to be confused with Store Mosse nature reserve, an area in Blekinge of the same name. The name is shared by another nature reserve in Uddevalla.

Accessing the park 

Store Mosse national park is located along national road 151, between Värnamo and Gnosjö in southern Sweden. It is accessible by car or bus. Two of the trails are suited for persons in wheelchairs; one trail is also adapted for blind visitors.

Naturum 
At the Store Mosse national park there is a visitors' center called Naturum, where information about the history of the national park and its landscape, plants and animals is available. The center also has a bookshop and exhibitions about the park.

See also 
 List of national parks of Sweden

References

External links 

Store Mosse nationalpark Länsstyrelsen i Jönköping County  
Sweden's National Parks: Store Mosse National Park from the Swedish Environmental Protection Agency

National parks of Sweden
Protected areas established in 1982
1982 establishments in Sweden
Geography of Jönköping County
Tourist attractions in Jönköping County
Ramsar sites in Sweden